Charlie Wild, Private Detective is an American detective series that aired on three of the four major American television networks of the 1950s.

Origin
The program was the televised version of a radio program with the same title. At least some of the episodes that were broadcast on CBS were simulcasts of the radio program.

Premise
Charlie Wild was a private investigator with headquarters in New York City, with most of his cases involving murder. He often used violence to solve cases, bending the law at times without actually breaking it. Effie Perrine was Wild's secretary.

A review of the program's premiere episode in the trade publication Billboard described the plot as "run-of-the-mill" except that "the menace ran to silk dressing gowns and Beethoven symphonies" as Wild solved two murders. The reviewer summarized by saying that the show needed "more original story approach and less hokum."

A subsequent Billboard review (of the September 11, 1951, episode) indicated little change in evaluation. Haps Kemper wrote that the "plot was routine, the script hardly scintillating, and the performance unenthusiastic" except for that of the female guest star.

Broadcasts
The series first aired live on CBS from December 22, 1950, to June 27, 1951 (20 episodes). It was initially on alternate Friday nights, but it moved to every Wednesday night effective the week of April 16. It then aired on ABC from September 11, 1951, to March 4, 1952 (27 episodes). On March 13, 1952, the DuMont Television Network picked the series up for the last three months, with 17 episodes, ending on June 19, 1952.

The CBS broadcasts were sponsored by Wildroot Cream-Oil hair tonic. The ABC series was sponsored by Mogen David wine.

Cast
John McQuade replaced Kevin O'Morrison as Charlie Wild after the first seven episodes. Cloris Leachman played Effie Perrine. Sandy Becker and Bob Williams were the announcers.

Episode status
Fifteen episodes are held by the UCLA Film and Television Archive, including two from the DuMont series. The Paley Center for Media holds four episodes from the DuMont series.

See also
List of programs broadcast by the DuMont Television Network
List of surviving DuMont Television Network broadcasts

References

Bibliography
David Weinstein, The Forgotten Network: DuMont and the Birth of American Television (Philadelphia: Temple University Press, 2004) 
Alex McNeil, Total Television, Fourth edition (New York: Penguin Books, 1980) 
Tim Brooks and Earle Marsh, The Complete Directory to Prime Time Network TV Shows, Third edition (New York: Ballantine Books, 1964)

External links
 
 List of episodes at CTVA
 DuMont historical website

1950 American television series debuts
1952 American television series endings
1950s American crime drama television series
American Broadcasting Company original programming
American live television shows
Black-and-white American television shows
CBS original programming
DuMont Television Network original programming
English-language television shows